Osdorf (German language: pronounced ) is a quarter in the city of Hamburg, Germany. It belongs to the Altona borough. In 2020 the population was 26,420.

History
In 1927 the former independent settlement Osdorf was made a part of the town Altona; in 1938 it was merged into the Hanseatic city of Hamburg with the Greater Hamburg Act.

After World War II, from 1950 to 1952, first new residential buildings were constructed near the streets of Blomkamp and Am Landpflegeheim. A major estate of prefabricated houses with 5,000 flats for 12,000 people, Osdorfer Born settlement, had been planned since 1963 and was erected from 1966 to 1971.

Geography
In 2006, according to the statistical office of Hamburg and Schleswig-Holstein, Osdorf had a total area of 7.3 km2. The southern boundaries of Osdorf to the quarter Nienstedten lead along the railway tracks of the city train. In the west, the town of Schenefeld in Schleswig-Holstein and the quarter Iserbrook are located. To the east are the quarters Lurup, Bahrenfeld, and Groß Flottbek. Lake Helmuth Schack, located in the former moor area Deesmoor, lies in the quarter. The stream of Düpenau runs through the lake, Luruper Moorgraben flows into it.

Demographics
In 2006 in Osdorf were living 25,206 inhabitants.

In 1999 there were 12,148 households, out of which 23.3% had children under the age of 18 living with them and 39.2% of all households were made up of individuals. The average household size was 2.12.

Population by year

The population is counted by the residential registration office for the December 31 each year.

In 2006 there were 2,402 criminal offences (96 crimes per 1000 people).

Education
There were 4 elementary schools and 4 secondary schools in the quarter Osdorf, the Lise-Meitner-Gymnasium among the latter.

A part of the Führungsakademie der Bundeswehr is located in the barracks Generalleutnant–Graf–von–Baudissin–Kaserne. The academy of the Bundeswehr educates officers for leading positions.

Culture

Recreation
The recreational area Bornpark is located at the border to Schleswig-Holstein. The Loki-Schmidt-Garten, also called Neuer Botanischer Garten (New Botanical Garden) is located in the area of the former independent municipality Klein Flottbek.

Infrastructure

Health systems
In Osdorf were 17 day-care centers for children, 48 physicians in private practice and 6 pharmacies.

Transportation
Osdorf is serviced by the rapid transit system of the city train lines S1 and S11 with the stations Hochkamp and Klein Flottbek.

According to the Department of Motor Vehicles (Kraftfahrt-Bundesamt), in the quarter Osdorf were 9,445 private cars registered (474 cars/1000 people). There were 123 traffic accidents total, including 106 traffic accidents with damage to persons.

Notes

References

 Statistical office Hamburg and Schleswig-Holstein Statistisches Amt für Hamburg und Schleswig-Holstein, official website 

 Osdorf, Hamburg.de

External links

 Academy of the Bundeswehr website  Führungsakademie der Bundeswehr

Quarters of Hamburg
Altona, Hamburg